Rifle Gap State Park is a Colorado State Park located in Garfield County near Rifle, Colorado.  The  park established in 1966 includes a  reservoir. Plant communities are pinyon-juniper woodlands, sagebrush shrubland with deciduous riparian forest in places along the edge of the Rifle Gap Reservoir. Commonly observed wildlife include mule deer, elk and great horned owls. Park facilities include a visitors center, campgrounds, picnic sites and a boat ramp.

References

Protected areas of Garfield County, Colorado
Geography of Colorado
Protected areas established in 1966
State parks of Colorado
1966 establishments in Colorado